Hyytiä is a Finnish surname. Notable people with the surname include:

Ensio Hyytiä (1938–2019), Finnish ski jumper
Mikko Hyytiä (born 1981), Finnish ice hockey player

Finnish-language surnames